The fifth season of the Fairy Tail anime series is directed by Shinji Ishihira and produced by A-1 Pictures and Satelight. Like the rest of the series, it follows the adventures of Natsu Dragneel and Lucy Heartfilia of the fictional guild Fairy Tail. Instead of adapting part of  Hiro Mashima's Fairy Tail manga, it features a completely original, self-contained story arc called , and focus on Natsu and the members of Fairy Tail as they meet a relative of the Heartfilias', and face a religious sect of warriors and a revived Oración Seis as they try to find the parts to an ancient doomsday weapon.

The season initially ran from April 14 to September 29, 2012 on TV Tokyo in Japan. Seven DVD compilations were released, each containing four episodes, by Pony Canyon between September 5, 2012 and March 6, 2013, including the last episode of the fourth season and first two episodes of the sixth season.  Funimation Entertainment released the episodes with their own English-dubbed version across three Blu-ray/DVD box sets, released on July 15, September 16, and October 28 in 2014. The episodes were made available on Funimation's website as "Season 5".

The season makes use of 4 pieces of theme music: two opening themes and two ending themes. The first opening theme,  performed by +Plus, is used for the first 12 episodes, and the second opening theme used for the remainder of the season is  performed by Hero.


Episode list

Notes

References

General

Specific

5
2012 Japanese television seasons